was a feudal domain under the Tokugawa shogunate of Edo period Japan, located in Hitachi Province (modern-day Ibaraki Prefecture), Japan. It was centered on Fuchū Jin'ya in what is now the city of Ishioka, Ibaraki.

History
The domain was created in 1602, when Rokugō Masanori, the head of the Rokugō clan, a prominent family of Dewa Province, was awarded a 10,000 koku holding in Hitachi-Fuchū for serviced rendered to Tokugawa Ieyasu during the Battle of Sekigahara. The clan was transferred to Honjō Domain in Dewa in 1623. The domain then passed into the hands of the Minagawa clan until 1645, when that clan was reduced to hatamoto status for lack of a direct heir.

In 1700, the domain was revived for the 5th son of Tokugawa Yorifusa of Mito Domain, who assumed the Matsudaira surname. The Matsudaira continued to rule the domain until the Meiji restoration. The domain was renamed Ishioka-han  in 1869. It was abolished in the Haihan Chiken order of 1871.

The domain had a population of 16,913 people in 2774 households, of who, 901 were classed as samurai in 198 household and 182 were classed as ashigaru in 109 households per a census in 1869.

Holdings at the end of the Edo period
As with most domains in the han system, Hitachi-Fuchū Domain consisted of several discontinuous territories calculated to provide the assigned kokudaka, based on periodic cadastral surveys and projected agricultural yields.

Hitachi Province
3 villages in Ibaraki District
9 villages in Namegata District
6 villages in Niihari District

List of daimyō

References

External links
  Hitachi-Fuchu  on "Edo 300 HTML"

Notes

1602 establishments in Japan
1871 disestablishments in Japan
Domains of Japan
History of Ibaraki Prefecture
Hitachi Province
Mitorenshi-Matsudaira clan
States and territories disestablished in 1871